Flipnic: Ultimate Pinball is a 2003 pinball video game for the PlayStation 2, developed by SCEI.

Gameplay
Flipnic features a wide variety of virtual pinball tables, some with realistic physics, others with antigravity, vertical climbs and other variations.

Reception

In 2011, Flipnic was listed in the book 1001 Video Games You Must Play Before You Die, where it was described as "a video game concept album about pinball games."

Writing on Games Asylum, Matt Gander praised it, saying "Gravity and realistic ball physics were thrown out the window, in favour of tables filled with loops and rollercoaster-style tracks for balls to whizz around in," but noted the tendency of the game to crash.

References

External links
Capcom Entertainment page

2003 video games
Capcom games
Pinball video games
PlayStation 2 games
PlayStation 2-only games
Video games developed in Japan